Ambulyx clavata is a species of moth of the family Sphingidae first described by Karl Jordan in 1929.

Distribution 
It is known to come from Sundaland and Thailand.

Gallery

Biology 
The larvae have been recorded feeding on Lagerstroemia species.

References

Ambulyx
Moths described in 1929
Moths of Africa
Moths of Asia